The governor-general of Barbados was the representative of the Barbadian monarch from independence in 1966 until the establishment of a republic in 2021. Under the government's Table of Precedence for Barbados, the governor-general of Barbados was regarded as being the most important of all personnel of the Barbados government.

The office was established by Chapter IV of the 1966 Constitution of Barbados. The governor-general was appointed by the monarch on the advice of the prime minister of Barbados. The governor-general exercised the monarch's executive powers and gave assent to bills in the monarch's name, promulgating them as laws. The powers of the monarch and the governor-general were limited, and they, in most instances, exercised authority on the advice of the prime minister or other persons or bodies within Barbados.

The office of the governor-general was established when Barbados gained independence in 1966. Since then, Barbados had 8 governors-general. On 30 November 2021, Barbados became a republic and the office of governor-general was abolished.

Duties
The Barbadian monarch, on the advice of her Barbadian prime minister, appointed a governor-general to be her representative in Barbados. Both the monarch and the governor-general held much power in the country, though it was rarely used unilaterally; it was usually only used in such a way in emergencies and in some cases war.

The governor-general represented the monarch on ceremonial occasions such as the State Opening of Parliament and the presentation of honours and military parades. Under the constitution, the governor-general was given authority to act in some matters; for example, in appointing and disciplining officers of the civil service, granting "any person convicted of any offence against the laws of Barbados a pardon", and in proroguing parliament. However, in only a few cases was the governor-general empowered to act entirely on his/her own discretion, often requiring the countersignature of the prime minister to exercise their powers.

The governor-general of Barbados also chaired the Privy Council of Barbados.

List of governors-general of Barbados
Following is a list of people who served as governor-general of Barbados from independence in 1966 to the establishment of a republic in 2021.

Symbols
 Died in office.

Timeline

Official oath of office 
According to the First Schedule section of the 1966 Constitution of Barbados, the official oath of office for the governor-general of Barbados was as follows:

Abolition

In September 2020, the government of Barbados announced that it planned to abolish the Barbadian monarchy and the position of the governor-general, and the Queen of Barbados to be replaced with a ceremonial president, akin to that of the president of Trinidad and Tobago. Incumbent governor-general Sandra Mason was elected president on 20 October 2021 and took office on 30 November 2021.

See also
Government House, the official residence of the governor-general
Order of Barbados
List of governors of Barbados
Governor-General of the West Indies Federation
List of prime ministers of Barbados

References

External links 
 
 About Queen Elizabeth II and her role in Barbados - Royal.uk
 Governor General of Barbados, Our Nation, Government of Barbados

 

Barbados, List of Governors-General of
 
Monarchy of Barbados
Governors-General
1966 establishments in Barbados
2021 disestablishments in Barbados
Barbados and the Commonwealth of Nations